Niagara is a city in Marinette County, Wisconsin, United States. The population was 1,624 at the 2010 census. The city lies to the north of and adjacent to the Town of Niagara. It is part of the Marinette, WI–MI Micropolitan Statistical Area.

History
The city of Niagara was founded in 1900 on the banks of the Menominee River.  Niagara is an Iroquois word that means "thundering waters", which is also used in the famous Niagara Falls, between New York and the Canadian province of Ontario.

Geography
Niagara is located at  (45.778244, -88.003867).

Demographics

2010 census
As of the census of 2010, there were 1,624 people, 695 households, and 440 families living in the city. The racial makeup of the city was 97.7% White, 0.1% African American, 0.6% Native American, 0.4% Asian, 0.2% from other races, and 0.9% from two or more races. Hispanic or Latino of any race were 1.2% of the population.

There were 695 households, of which 29.9% had children under the age of 18 living with them, 47.5% were married couples living together, 10.4% had a female householder with no husband present, 5.5% had a male householder with no wife present, and 36.7% were non-families. 30.4% of all households were made up of individuals, and 15.8% had someone living alone who was 65 years of age or older. The average household size was 2.34 and the average family size was 2.88.

The median age in the city was 41.1 years. 24.4% of residents were under the age of 18; 6% were between the ages of 18 and 24; 25.2% were from 25 to 44; 26.6% were from 45 to 64; and 18% were 65 years of age or older. The gender makeup of the city was 48.0% male and 52.0% female.

2000 census
As of the census of 2000, there were 1,880 people, 760 households, and 494 families living in the city. The racial makeup of the city was 99.52% White, 0.05% Black or African American, 0.16% Native American, 0.05% Asian, 0.05% from other races, and 0.16% from two or more races. 0.74% of the population were Hispanic or Latino of any race.

There were 760 households, out of which 32.4% had children under the age of 18 living with them, 50.7% were married couples living together, 9.7% had a female householder with no husband present, and 34.9% were non-families. 31.1% of all households were made up of individuals, and 16.7% had someone living alone who was 65 years of age or older. The average household size was 2.39 and the average family size was 3.01.

In the city, the population was spread out, with 26.8% under the age of 18, 6.5% from 18 to 24, 27.6% from 25 to 44, 20.5% from 45 to 64, and 18.7% who were 65 years of age or older. The median age was 39 years. For every 100 females, there were 90.7 males. For every 100 females age 18 and over, there were 84.6 males.

The median income for a household in the city was $33,828, and the median income for a family was $41,711. Males had a median income of $35,000 versus $20,820 for females. The per capita income for the city was $15,616. About 5.4% of families and 9.9% of the population were below the poverty line, including 8.6% of those under age 18 and 15.9% of those age 65 or over.

Notable people
Anna DeForge, professional basketball player
Royal T. Farrand, physician and college football player
Michael J. McCarthy, U.S. Air Force Major General
Ian Kawetschanky, AIESEC United States Member Committee President 2019-20

Images

References

External links

Niagara Area Business Association
Sanborn fire insurance map: 1911

Cities in Wisconsin
Cities in Marinette County, Wisconsin
Marinette micropolitan area